Nepenthes parvula is a tropical pitcher plant native to the Cape York Peninsula of Queensland, Australia.

It is the fourth Nepenthes species recorded from the continent and its third endemic species. Nepenthes parvula is closely related to the three other Australian Nepenthes species: N. mirabilis, N. rowaniae and  N. tenax.

The specific epithet parvula refers to the diminutive size of mature plants.

References

Carnivorous plants of Australia
parvula
Plants described in 2016
Caryophyllales of Australia
Flora of Queensland